Siamak Varzideh (born 8 August 1970) is an Iranian boxer. He competed in the men's middleweight event at the 1992 Summer Olympics.

References

External links
 

1970 births
Living people
Iranian male boxers
Olympic boxers of Iran
Boxers at the 1992 Summer Olympics
Place of birth missing (living people)
Boxers at the 1990 Asian Games
Boxers at the 1994 Asian Games
Asian Games bronze medalists for Iran
Asian Games medalists in boxing
Medalists at the 1990 Asian Games
Middleweight boxers
21st-century Iranian people
20th-century Iranian people